Tamar Gozansky (also spelt Tamar Gozhansky; born 3 October 1940) is an Israeli politician.

Biography
Tamar Gozansky was born in Petah Tikva during the Mandate period to a Russian Jewish family. She earned  an MSc in Economics from Leningrad State University. She later worked as an economist.

Political career
Gozansky joined Maki (the Israeli Communist Party), the major part of the Hadash alliance. She entered the Knesset in July 1990 as a replacement for veteran Hadash MK Tawfik Toubi and retained her seat in the 1992 elections, after which she chaired the Knesset's joint committee on early childhood.

She was reelected in 1996, and again chaired the joint committee on early childhood. Following a third re-election in 1999 she became chairwoman of the committee on the rights of the child and the special committee for school dropout rates

Prior to the 2003 election, Gozansky announced that she would not seek re-election, which required a special majority of the party for its veteran representatives in the Knesset.

Further reading
Economic Independence - How? (1969)
The Development of Capitalism in Palestine (1988)

References

External links

Bat Shalom (Daughter of Peace)
Official Maki website

1940 births
Israeli economists
Israeli communists
Israeli Jews
Israeli people of Russian-Jewish descent
Women members of the Knesset
Saint Petersburg State University alumni
People from Petah Tikva
Living people
Hadash politicians
Jewish socialists
Jews in Mandatory Palestine
Maki (political party) politicians
Members of the 12th Knesset (1988–1992)
Members of the 13th Knesset (1992–1996)
Members of the 14th Knesset (1996–1999)
Members of the 15th Knesset (1999–2003)
21st-century Israeli women politicians
20th-century Israeli women politicians